Joseph Bau (13 June 1920 – 24 May 2002) was a Polish-born Israeli artist, philosopher, inventor, animator, comedian, commercial creator, copy-writer, poet, and survivor of the Płaszów concentration camp.

Life 
Bau was trained as a graphic artist at the Jan Matejko Academy of Fine Arts in Kraków, Poland. His education was interrupted by World War II and he was transferred to the Płaszów concentration camp in late 1942 from the Kraków Ghetto. Having a talent in gothic lettering, he was employed in the camp for making signs and maps for the Germans. While in Płaszów, Bau created a miniature, the size of his hand, illustrated book with his own poetry. He also forged documents and identity papers for people who managed to escape from the camp.

During his imprisonment, Bau fell in love with another inmate, Rebecca Tennenbaum. They were secretly married, despite the prohibition by the Germans, in the women's barracks of Płaszów. This was dramatized in Steven Spielberg's Academy Award-winning movie Schindler's List, where he was played by Rami Heuberger. Bau himself appears in the film's epilogue placing a stone on Oskar Schindler's grave in Jerusalem, along with his wife Rebecca.

After Płaszów, Bau was transferred to Gross-Rosen concentration camp and then to Schindler's camp where he stayed until the end of the war, while Rebecca was sent to Auschwitz. After liberation, Bau was reunited with his wife and finished his degree at University of Plastic Arts in Kraków. In 1950, he immigrated to Israel together with his wife and three-year-old daughter, Hadassah, where their other daughter, Clila, was born. He worked as a graphic artist at the Brandwein Institute in Haifa and for the government of Israel. Bau opened his own studio in 1956 in Tel Aviv, which is now a museum managed by his daughters. He was well known for creating graphic fonts and drawing titles for Israeli films in the 1960s and 1970s. He also authored a number of Hebrew books and write poetry.

Bau's wife Rebecca died in 1997. Bau died from pneumonia in Tel Aviv on 24  May 2002, at age 81.

Works 
The English version of Joseph Bau's memoir, Dear God, Have You Ever Gone Hungry? came out in June 1998. It was first published in Hebrew and Polish and was published in several languages, including Chinese.

Joseph Bau also created his own animated films, for which he has been referred to in the press as the "Israeli Walt Disney" or as the "founder of Israel's animation industry". His paintings and drawings have been listed by Sotheby's as significant contributions to the art of the Holocaust and his works have been shown in galleries in the US.

Joseph Bau's art is filtered through the prism of his own experiences. It reflects both the brutal reality of life during the war, as well as the joy and humour he observed in later years in Israel. Joseph Bau was nominated for the Israel Prize in 1998.

References

External links 
Joseph Bau's Home Page 
 Giuseppe Sedia, Josef Bau: Israel’s Walt Disney and Mapmaker of Hell , in  The Krakow Post, 7 September 2012.

1920 births
2002 deaths
Polish Jews in Israel
20th-century Israeli Jews
20th-century Polish Jews
Citizens of Israel through Law of Return
20th-century Israeli male writers
20th-century Israeli male artists
Gross-Rosen concentration camp survivors
Israeli animators
Israeli animated film directors
Polish animated film directors
Israeli illustrators
Jewish Israeli writers
Israeli memoirists
Israeli male poets
Jewish Combat Organization members
Jewish Israeli artists
Jewish poets
Kraków-Płaszów concentration camp survivors
Kraków Ghetto inmates
Polish cartoonists
Polish emigrants to Israel
Israeli people of Polish-Jewish descent
Schindlerjuden
Burials at Nahalat Yitzhak Cemetery
Jan Matejko Academy of Fine Arts alumni
20th-century memoirists
Deaths from pneumonia in Israel